Robert Ramirez is a former legislator in the U.S. state of Colorado. Elected to the Colorado House of Representatives as a Republican, Ramirez represented House District 29, which centers around the communities of Westminster and Arvada, from 2010 to 2012.

Biography
Ramirez was born in New Jersey to a Mexican father and an American mother. His parents divorced when he was eight years old; he and his two siblings were raised by their mother, who worked as a survey engineer among other jobs. As a young person he was active in Boy Scouts of America, and he went on to earn his Eagle Scout.

Education and career
After graduating from high school Ramirez enlisted in the United States Navy and was honorably discharged in 1988. He worked for several years in management positions in Texas then, moved to Arvada, Colorado. In 2002 and he moved to Westminster, Colorado. He has been a part of several entrepreneur ventures. Before beginning his legislative career he managed a Denver-based uniform supply company.

Ramirez earned an associate degree in business. His wife, Suzanne, is an elementary school teacher and has worked in Jefferson County schools since 2001. Ramirez attributes his political aspirations to his daughter prodding him to serve.

Legislative career

2010 election

In the 2010 legislative session, Ramirez served on the Transportation and Education committees.

2011 legislative session

2012 legislative session

2012 election
In the 2012 General Election, Representative Ramirez faced Democratic challenger Tracy Kraft-Tharp.  Kraft-Tharp was elected by a margin of 51% to 43%.

References

External links 
 Ramirez for Colorado

American politicians of Mexican descent
Republican Party members of the Colorado House of Representatives
Living people
Year of birth missing (living people)
21st-century American politicians